She's a Sweetheart is a 1944 American musical film directed by Del Lord and starring Jane Frazee.

Plot
A woman known to all simply as "Mom" runs a canteen where soldiers in particular are welcome. Maxine is a singer at the club and has stolen the heart of one of Mom's favorite young men, Rocky, who is about to return to active duty.

Mom keeps an eye on several couples. Frances is jealous because Jimmy has asked her to help him compose love letters. Jeannie is unaware that the soldier she loves, Paul, has returned from the war. Paul was honorably discharged with an injury but is reluctant to be loved by Jeannie out of pity.

Rocky was unhappy when he left after being led to believe Maxine was leading him on all along. He is reported missing in action, causing Maxine and Mom to both miss him terribly. Frances is delighted to learn that those love letters were for her. When she and Jimmy are wed, Jeannie is shocked to find Paul there and they are reunited. At a party honoring the troops, a sad Maxine, while singing to the men, looks up and is thrilled to see Rocky.

Cast
Jane Frazee as Maxine Lecour
Larry Parks as Rocky Hill
Jane Darwell as Mom
Nina Foch as Jeannie
Ross Hunter as Paul
Jimmy Lloyd as Pete Ryan
Loren Tindall as Jimmy Loomis
Carole Mathews as Frances
Eddie Bruce as Fred Tilly
Pat Lane as Matt
Danny Desmond as Poker
Ruth Warren as Edith
Dave Willock as Wes

External links
 
Review of film at Variety

1944 films
1944 musical films
American black-and-white films
Columbia Pictures films
American musical films
Films directed by Del Lord
1940s English-language films
1940s American films